Birkenfeld is a district (Landkreis) in Rhineland-Palatinate, Germany. Its seat is the town of Birkenfeld. It is bounded by (from the south and clockwise) the districts of Sankt Wendel (Saarland), Trier-Saarburg, Bernkastel-Wittlich, Rhein-Hunsrück, Bad Kreuznach and Kusel.

History 
In the early nineteenth century, the Nahe River was the boundary between two tiny principalities:  Birkenfeld, west of the Nahe; and Lichtenberg, east of it.  The principality of Birkenfeld was annexed by Oldenburg in 1817; Lichtenberg became an exclave of the Duchy Saxe-Coburg (Saxe-Coburg-Saalfeld until 1826, Saxe-Coburg and Gotha thereafter).  Prussia bought Lichtenberg in 1834 and made it the District of Sankt Wendel.

After World War I, the southern half of Sankt Wendel had to be ceded to the newly created Saar Territory, and the small part remaining in Prussia was then officially called the Restkreis Sankt Wendel ("remaining district of Sankt Wendel"). In 1937 the Oldenburgian District of Birkenfeld was merged with the remaining Sankt Wendel District to form the new Prussian District of Birkenfeld.

Following World War II, on 18 July 1946 by the French Ordinance No. 8, twenty-four more villages were ceded to the new Délégation Supérieure de la Sarre, which became the new Saar Protectorate in 1947. Not until 1970 were the present borders of the district set.

Geography 
The Nahe River runs through the district from south to north. The portions west of the river are located on the eastern slopes of the Hunsrück.

Coat of arms 
The German blazon reads: Geschachtet von Rot und Silber; belegt mit einem rot gezungten, golden gekrönten und golden bewehrten blauen Löwen.

The arms might in English heraldic language be described thus: Chequy of twenty gules and argent a lion rampant azure armed and crowned Or and langued of the first.

The chequered red and silver pattern was the arms of the Counts of Sponheim, a medieval county of the region. The lion is the symbol of the Counts of Veldenz.

Towns and municipalities 

Verband-free town: Idar-Oberstein
{|
! colspan=4|Verbandsgemeinden
|- valign=top
||
1. Baumholder
 Baumholder1, 2
 Berglangenbach 
 Berschweiler bei Baumholder 
 Eckersweiler 
 Fohren-Linden 
 Frauenberg 
 Hahnweiler 
 Heimbach 
 Leitzweiler 
 Mettweiler 
 Reichenbach 
 Rohrbach 
 Rückweiler 
 Ruschberg 
||
2. Birkenfeld
 Abentheuer 
 Achtelsbach 
 Birkenfeld1, 2
 Börfink 
 Brücken 
 Buhlenberg 
 Dambach 
 Dienstweiler 
 Elchweiler 
 Ellenberg 
 Ellweiler 
 Gimbweiler 
 Gollenberg 
 Hattgenstein 
 Hoppstädten-Weiersbach 
 Kronweiler 
 Leisel 
 Meckenbach 
 Niederbrombach 
 Niederhambach 
 Nohen 
 Oberbrombach 
 Oberhambach 
 Rimsberg 
 Rinzenberg 
 Rötsweiler-Nockenthal 
 Schmißberg 
 Schwollen 
 Siesbach 
 Sonnenberg-Winnenberg 
 Wilzenberg-Hußweiler 
||
3. Herrstein-Rhaunen
 Allenbach 
 Asbach 
 Bergen 
 Berschweiler bei Kirn 
 Bollenbach 
 Breitenthal 
 Bruchweiler 
 Bundenbach
 Dickesbach 
 Fischbach 
 Gerach 
 Gösenroth
 Griebelschied 
 Hausen 
 Hellertshausen 
 Herborn 
 Herrstein1
 Hettenrodt 
 Hintertiefenbach 
 Horbruch 
 Hottenbach 
 Kempfeld 
 Kirschweiler 
 Krummenau 
 Langweiler 
||

 Mackenrodt 
 Mittelreidenbach 
 Mörschied 
 Niederhosenbach 
 Niederwörresbach 
 Oberhosenbach 
 Oberkirn
 Oberreidenbach 
 Oberwörresbach 
 Rhaunen
 Schauren 
 Schmidthachenbach
 Schwerbach 
 Sensweiler 
 Sien 
 Sienhachenbach 
 Sonnschied 
 Stipshausen 
 Sulzbach 
 Veitsrodt 
 Vollmersbach 
 Weiden 
 Weitersbach 
 Wickenrodt 
 Wirschweiler 
|-
|colspan=4 align=center|1seat of the Verbandsgemeinde; 2town
|}

References

External links 

  (German)

 
Districts of Rhineland-Palatinate